Baby Boy Horry (c. December 3, 2008 – December 4, 2008) was a formerly unidentified American baby and murder victim whose body was found off of South Carolina Highway 544, on the outskirts of Conway in Horry County, South Carolina on December 4, 2008.

Investigation 
The deceased infant was located by utility workers in the area wrapped in a tote bag, and placed inside of a box in a wooded area along the highway. Coroner reports made it apparent that the infant had died of hypothermia, due to exposure to the elements, but was otherwise viable at the time of death. The child remained unidentified when the case eventually ran out of leads, and was declared a cold case until March 3, 2020, when the Horry County Police Department released new information regarding the case, initially supplied by the child's publicly-unidentified father. Jennifer Lynn Sahr, formerly Rickel, 32, of Pensacola, Florida, who was a student of Coastal Carolina University at the time, was arrested in North Myrtle Beach following the release of physical evidence confirming her as the mother of Baby Boy Horry. Sahr was incarcerated at the J. Reuben Long Detention Center in Conway on March 4, 2020, charged with the count of homicide by child abuse, where she faced 20 years to life imprisonment for her alleged crime. On March 6, Sahr was denied during a bond hearing. At this hearing, Solicitor Jimmy Richardson read a letter, penned by the child's father, on his behalf, as he was not in the court. The letter read:"At this time, I would like to ask for privacy and respect for my family as we grieve over the death of my first and only born child and son. Again, I would like to thank everyone involved in bringing justice to my baby boy. I would also like to thank Rolling Thunder Motorcycle Club for all they have done, as well as the community members who made sure my child was never alone on any of his birthdays. I would like to ask for prayers during this difficult time as we all grieve for Baby Boy Horry."

References 

2008 births
2008 deaths
2008 in South Carolina
Filicides in the United States
Incidents of violence against boys
Infanticide
Killings in South Carolina